Harry Orman "Jake" Robinson (February 26, 1872 – October 1933) was an American football player and coach.  He served as the head football coach at the University of Missouri (1893–1894), the University of Texas at Austin (1896), and the University of Maine (1897), compiling a career college football record of 13–10–1.  The Bangor, Maine, native was born on February 26, 1872, and  played football as a lineman at Tufts University.

Head coaching record

Football

References

1872 births
1933 deaths
Maine Black Bears football coaches
Missouri Tigers football coaches
Texas Longhorns football coaches
Tufts Jumbos football players
Sportspeople from Bangor, Maine
People from Dexter, Maine
Players of American football from Maine